Bukovka is a municipality and village in Pardubice District in the Pardubice Region of the Czech Republic. It has about 400 inhabitants.

Administrative parts
The village of Habřinka is an administrative part of Bukovka.

References

External links

Villages in Pardubice District